During the 1994–95 English football season, Nottingham Forest F.C. competed in the FA Premier League. Surprisingly for a newly promoted side, Forest finished in third place, behind Blackburn Rovers and Manchester United: no newly promoted club has achieved as high a finish in the Premier League since, although this achievement was matched by Newcastle United's previous season and six seasons later, Ipswich Town would finish fifth which, to this day, is the highest placing finish a promoted club has achieved since.

Season summary
After achieving promotion back to the Premiership at the first attempt, Nottingham Forest continued to succeed in life after Brian Clough as new manager Frank Clark guided them to an impressive third-place finish and UEFA Cup qualification, giving Forest their first European campaign of the post-Heysel era. Never out of the top-six throughout the season, Forest seemingly mounted an unexpected serious title challenge in the first quarter of the season, finding themselves in 2nd. Unfortunately, they couldn't quite keep up the title push and hit a bad run of form throughout most of winning just five out of 20 league games but an unbeaten run of nine wins in their final 12 league games during Spring saw them finish third, 12 points adrift of champions Blackburn Rovers, nonetheless a magnificent achievement.

Striker Stan Collymore was on target 22 times in the league and speculation that he would be on his way to another club proved correct at the end of the season when he sold to Liverpool for a national record fee of £8.4 million. The failure of Clark to buy a proven replacement cast significant doubt over whether Forest could mount a serious challenge for honours in the post-Collymore era.

Kit
The kit was sponsored by Canadian brewery Labatts.

Final league table

Results summary

Results by round

Results

Premier League

FA Cup

League Cup

Squad

Left club during season

Reserve squad

Transfers

In

Out

Transfers in:  £2,550,000
Transfers out:  £200,000
Total spending:  £2,350,000

Statistics

Appearances and goals

|-
! colspan=14 style=background:#dcdcdc; text-align:center| Goalkeepers

|-
! colspan=14 style=background:#dcdcdc; text-align:center| Defenders

|-
! colspan=14 style=background:#dcdcdc; text-align:center| Midfielders

|-
! colspan=14 style=background:#dcdcdc; text-align:center| Forwards

|-
! colspan=14 style=background:#dcdcdc; text-align:center| Players transferred out during the season

|-

Starting 11
Considering appearances in all competitions

References

Nottingham Forest F.C. seasons
Nottingham Forest